Claws is an American comedy-drama television series that aired on TNT from June 11, 2017, to February 6, 2022. The series was ordered for a first season containing 10 episodes on December 13, 2016, and was originally developed as a half-hour, single-camera comedy for HBO. Set in Palmetto, Florida, the series is mostly filmed in New Orleans. 

On July 12, 2017, TNT renewed the series for a second season, which premiered on June 10, 2018. On July 2, 2018, TNT renewed the series for a third season, which premiered on June 9, 2019. On October 1, 2019, TNT renewed the series for a fourth and final season, which officially premiered on December 19, 2021.

Premise
Five manicurists at the Nail Artisans salon of Manatee County, Florida, enter the traditionally male world of organized crime when they begin laundering money for a neighboring pain clinic and eventually work their way up to controlling their own criminal empire.

Cast

Main
 Niecy Nash as Desna Simms: the owner of Nail Artisans, a nail salon in Manatee County, Florida, and an associate of the Husser family. She launders money for one of their most profitable pill mills, so she can save up and buy a better salon. She is in a relationship with Roller Husser, the adopted son of his uncle, Uncle Daddy. When Uncle Daddy withholds some of her earnings, she blames Roller. She and Virginia, with whom he was cheating on Desna, attempt to kill him. It is later revealed that Desna and her brother, Dean, spent their childhoods with abusive foster parents, explaining why she's so determined to build a life for herself. She eventually gets permission to leave the mob but is subsequently forced to continue laundering money for the Russian Mafia. Desna ultimately sets out to build her own crime family after her brother kills the head of the Russian mob.
 Carrie Preston as Polly Marks: a redheaded North Carolinian who helps manage Desna's criminal enterprises. A former professional con artist, pathological liar, and skilled burglar, she only recently made parole for running a Social Security fraud scheme. Her relationship with Desna is one of absolute loyalty; she even threatens Virginia with a knife when she nearly implicates Desna in Roller's "death". She also forms a motherly bond with Marnie, an adolescent girl seeking to escape her own neglectful mother, who is trying to force Marnie into prostitution. Preston also portrays Lillian Marks, Polly's twin sister who pressures her to own up to her mistakes. 
 Judy Reyes as Annalise "Quiet Ann" Zayas: the salon's lookout, doorman, and Desna's enforcer. She is college-educated, with plans to become a teacher, but her career was ruined when she was convicted of attempting to murder her husband after he stabbed her girlfriend. Ann, openly bisexual, has difficulty balancing her relationships with her role in the mafia, especially when she falls for a female police detective investigating the salon with whom she later breaks up. Later at the end of the third season, she has sex with a handsome guy she encounters at the party, which leads to an unexpected pregnancy.
 Karrueche Tran as Virginia Loc: a former stripper for Uncle Daddy's strip club, She She's, but now works at Nail Artisans. Desna fires her and throws her out in disgust after finding out she is sleeping around with Roller and suspecting that Virginia was the one who told Roller about Polly's ankle bracelet. Eventually, Virginia is accepted when she shoots Roller to defend Desna and proves her willingness to master the manicurist's trade. Later, she becomes pregnant after having sex with Dean, but goes through with an abortion and says yes when he asks to marry her. A failed assassination attempt causes her to lose an eye; the transplant, taken from a practicing psychic, gives Virginia empathetic abilities. She now runs the salon on Desna's behalf.
 Jenn Lyon as Jennifer Husser: Desna's oldest friend, right-hand woman, and Bryce's wife, with whom she has one daughter and another from a previous relationship. Having already lost more than a few relatives to the consequences of organized crime, she is adamant that Bryce not be part of his family's criminal business, but he does so nonetheless, causing a rift to form between her and Desna. When her family is absorbed by the Russians, she manages to keep her position at the salon thanks to Desna vouching on her behalf. However, an affair she has with a man named Hank threatens her marriage with Bryce, until they reconcile and she vows to be more faithful.
 Jack Kesy as Dwayne "Roller" Husser (seasons 1–3): Uncle Daddy's nephew, boyfriend to Desna and a high-powered drug dealer whose supposed death in the first episode triggers a conflict between the Hussers and Desna's salon. It is later revealed that he is alive, having been imprisoned by a woman as her sex slave. He escapes and rejoins his family, but when his dealings with the Russians are exposed, he and his brother and uncle are forced to work for them. He's in love with Desna even though he doesn't say it. He has sex with Desna and gets back together with her, even after she tried to kill him. He tries to shoot Desna but couldn't do it because she tells him she loves him. Eventually, he finds himself helping Desna establish her criminal empire. He later flees to Havana at the end of the third season in order to escape murder charges in the death of his cousin Clint.
 Kevin Rankin as Bryce Husser: Jennifer's husband and Roller's brother, who joins the Dixie Mafia to get justice for Roller's death and takes over his narcotics racket, though he is struggling to control his own addiction. When Roller unexpectedly returns, the two clash over his success. Bryce is subsequently forced to relinquish control of his business to the Russians when they absorb the Husser family and is later shot while taking part in an attack on his boss, Zlata. He and Jenn fix their relationship and try to leave the mob life behind, but return once they realize that they can't.
 Jason Antoon as Ken Brickman: a shady medical doctor who runs one of the Husser family's pill mills. He suffers from emotional instability stemming from his failed marriage but ends up finding a potential new romance with Polly. However, she dumps him when his work as a police informant is exposed.
 Harold Perrineau as Dean Simms: Desna's autistic brother whom she takes care of. He takes up bodybuilding as a hobby following Roller's "death", and falls in love with Virginia, one of his sister's associates. He also frees his sister from the grip of the Russians when he kills her boss, Zlata.
 Dean Norris as Clay "Uncle Daddy" Husser: Bryce's and Roller's uncle and the ruthless head of the Husser crime family. After the latter disappears, he starts grooming the former to succeed him but realizes too late that Roller's actions have put the family into deep debt with the Russians. Stripped of his independence, he turns to the Haitian mob for assistance. He now seeks to rebuild the Husser family by any means necessary.
 Jimmy Jean-Louis as Gregory Ruval (recurring in season 1; starring in season 2): A doctor and Desna's love interest, whose role as a boss in the Haitian mafia is unknown to her. He forms an alliance with the Hussers when they lose their interest in the Russians. Desna winds up killing him on their wedding night in the second season finale after learning that he plans to kill her.
 Suleka Mathew as Arlene Branch (recurring season 1; starring seasons 2–3): Quiet Ann's girlfriend and a detective investigating Desna and Dr. Ken. Ann is reluctantly forced to frame her for drunk driving, and she is ultimately fired from the police force. However, this is a ruse as part of a sting operation aimed against the Russians and Desna. Ann subsequently breaks up with her for this deception. They eventually get back together and plan to start a family after Ann learns of her pregnancy from a prior one-night stand. Tragically, Arlene is murdered near the end of the third season by Benedict "The Professor" Liu.
 Evan Daigle as Toby Evans (recurring seasons 1–2; starring season 3; guest season 4): Uncle Daddy's boy toy who accompanies him everywhere. Uncle Daddy later cuts ties with him after he betrays Roller to the police over the murder of his other nephew Clint, and Toby later dies of unknown circumstances between the third and fourth seasons. He later reappears in the afterlife alongside Juanda near the end of the series, with both reuniting with Uncle Daddy following his death.

Recurring
 Dale Dickey as Juanda "Auntie Mama" Husser (seasons 1–2 & 4): Clay's wife who was killed by the Russians in the first season's finale. She appears as hallucinations to Clay in seasons 2 and 4.
 Hunter Burke as Hank Gluck (seasons 1–2): the owner of the Jewish cafeteria in Palmetto and a former sexual partner to Jennifer Husser. He is stabbed dead by her husband Bryce after signing over his property to the Hussers.
 Andrea Sooch as Riva (seasons 1–3): head of a powerful Russian mob family that does business in Florida. She's killed by her sister Zlata in the season 2 premiere.
 Franka Potente as Zlata Ostrovsky (season 2): the newly reformed, former black sheep daughter of a powerful Russian mob family that does business in Florida. She kills her sister Riva and assumes control of the Husser family's criminal interests, while also taking Desna under her wing. However, this is secretly a ruse to allow the Russians to seize the assets of the Haitian mafia. Zlata then tries to kill Desna, only to be shot dead by her brother Dean.
 Katherine Reis as Olga Ostrovsky (season 2): Zlata's daughter whom Roller was forced to marry. Despite their relationship being an arrangement, Olga develops real feelings for Roller over time, only for him to kick her out when she tips off Ruval to Desna plotting against him.
 Sheryl Lee Ralph as Matilde Ruval (season 2): the Haitian mother of Gregory, who runs a charity for orphaned girls. Although she appears to be disabled, this turns out to be false when she confronts Desna following her son's murder. Zlata then shoots Matilde and leaves her to bleed to death.
 Sherry Cola as Lucy Chen (seasons 2–3): a classified special agent working alongside Arlene to bring down the Russians.
 Glynn Turman as Calvin (season 3), Desna and Dean's estranged father who comes back into their lives trying to make amends after turning his life around from drug addictions 
 Bechir Sylvain as EJ (seasons 3–4): Jenn's ex-boyfriend and a recently released convict. He is the father of her biracial daughter Brienne.
 Michael Horse as Mac Lovestone (season 3): the Native American owner of the Bayside Rapture casino and a money launderer for various crime syndicates.
 Rebecca Creskoff as Melba Lovestone (season 3): Mac's wife and a co-owner of the casino. Due to lung damage from smoking, she constantly has to take breaths from an oxygen mask.
 Anthony K. Hyatt as Tony (season 4): An undercover DEA agent who infiltrates Desna's crew in the fourth season, and briefly woos her before later being killed by Bryce, who believed him to be having an affair with his wife Jennifer.

Episodes

Season 1 (2017)

Season 2 (2018)

Season 3 (2019)

Season 4 (2021–22)

Development

Filming

On March 12, 2020, Warner Bros. Television shut down production on the series' fourth and final season due to the COVID-19 pandemic. Filming resumed on September 21, 2020, and concluded on November 30, 2020.

Reception

Critical response
The first season of Claws has received mostly positive reviews. On the review aggregator website Rotten Tomatoes, the series has an approval rating of 81% based on 31 reviews, with an average rating of 6.69/10. The website's critical consensus reads, "Well-acted, visually impressive, and energetically paced, Claws leaves a mark with a strong first season that hints at even greater potential." Metacritic, which uses a weighted average, assigned a score of 64 out of 100 based on 21 critics, indicating "generally favorable reviews". Variety described the show as aesthetically captivating but with weak storytelling. Season 2 has an 88% approval rating on Rotten Tomatoes, with an average rating of 8.6/10 based on 8 reviews.

Ratings

Season 1

Season 2

Season 3

Season 4

Accolades

Notes

References

External links

2010s American comedy-drama television series
2010s American crime drama television series
2010s American LGBT-related drama television series
2017 American television series debuts
2022 American television series endings
English-language television shows
Serial drama television series
Television productions suspended due to the COVID-19 pandemic
Television series by Studio T
Television series by Warner Horizon Television
Television series by Warner Bros. Television Studios
Television shows set in Florida
Television shows filmed in New Orleans
TNT (American TV network) original programming
Fashion-themed television series
Autism in television
Works about the Russian Mafia